Dho Tarap is a village in located in the Dolpo Buddha Rural Municipality of Dolpa District of Karnali Province (previously Karnali Zone of Mid-Western Development Regionl) of north-western Nepal. At the time of the 2011 Nepal census, it had a population of 923 people living in 205 individual households.

Dho Village (Ward-1, Dolpo Buddha RM) and its neighbor villages Lang (Ward-2, Dolpo Buddha RM) and Tokyou (Ward-3, Dolpo Buddha RM) are collectively known as Dho-Tarap.

Gallery

References

External links
UN map of the municipalities of Dolpa District

Populated places in Dolpa District